Senator Devlin may refer to:

John H. Devlin (1891–1967), Pennsylvania State Senate
Richard Devlin (born 1952), Oregon State Senate